The bush dog (Speothos venaticus) is a canine found in Central and South America. In spite of its extensive range, it is very rare in most areas except in Suriname, Guyana and Peru; it was first identified by Peter Wilhelm Lund from fossils in Brazilian caves and was believed to be extinct. The bush dog is the only living species in the genus Speothos, and genetic evidence suggests that its closest living relative is the maned wolf of central South America or the African wild dog. The species is listed as Near Threatened by the IUCN.

In Brazil it is called cachorro-vinagre ("vinegar dog") or cachorro-do-mato ("bush dog"). In Spanish-speaking countries it is called perro vinagre ("vinegar dog"), zorro vinagre ("vinegar fox"), perro de agua ("water dog"), or perro de monte ("mountain dog").

Description

Adult bush dogs have soft long brownish-tan fur, with a lighter reddish tinge on the head, neck and back and a bushy tail, while the underside is dark, sometimes with a lighter throat patch. Younger individuals, however, have black fur over their entire bodies. They have short legs relative to their body, as well as a short snout and relatively small ears.

The teeth are adapted for its carnivorous habits. The bush dog is one of three canid species (the other two being the dhole and the African wild dog) with trenchant heel dentition, having a single cusp on the talonid of the lower carnassial tooth that increases the cutting blade length. Females have four pairs of teats and both sexes have large scent glands on either side of the anus. Bush dogs have partially webbed toes, which allow them to swim more efficiently.

Genetics
Speothos has a diploid chromosome number of 74, and so it is unable to produce fertile hybrids with other canids.

Distribution and habitat

Bush dogs are found from Costa Rica in Central America and through much of South America east of the Andes, as far south as central Bolivia, Paraguay and southern Brazil. They primarily inhabit lowland forests up to  elevation, wet savannas and other habitats near rivers, but may also be found in drier cerrado and open pasture. The historic range of this species may have extended as far north as Costa Rica where the species may still be found in suitable habitat. New, repeated observations of bush dog groups have been recorded in east-central (Barbilla National Park) and south-eastern (La Amistad International Park) Costa Rica, and a substantial portion of the Talamanca Mountains up to 120 km to the north-northwest and at elevations up to 2,119 m. Very recent fossils dating from 300 A.D. to 900 A.D.(the Late Ceramic Age) have been found in the Manzanilla site on the eastern coast of Trinidad.

There are three recognised subspecies:
 The South American bush dog (Speothos venaticus venaticus), with a range including southern Colombia and Venezuela, the Guyanas, most of Brazil, eastern Ecuador and Peru, Bolivia, and northern Paraguay.
 The Panamanian bush dog (Speothos venaticus panamensis), with a range including Panama, northern Colombia and Venezuela, western Ecuador.
 The southern bush dog (Speothos venaticus wingei), with a range including southern Brazil and Paraguay, as well as extreme northeastern Argentina. The first camera trap photos of this species in Argentina were obtained in April 2016 from the Selva Paranaense Don Otto Ecological Private Reserve, located in Eldorado Department of the Misiones province of Argentina.

Behavior
Bush dogs are carnivores and hunt during the day. Their typical prey are pacas, agoutis, acouchis and capybaras, all large rodents. Although they can hunt alone, bush dogs are usually found in small packs. The dogs can bring down much larger prey, including peccaries and rheas, and a pack of six dogs has even been reported hunting a  tapir, where they trailed the animal and nipped at its legs until it was felled. When hunting paca, part of the pack chases it on land and part wait for it in the water, where it often retreats. 

Bush dogs appear to be the most gregarious South American canid species. They use hollow logs and cavities such as armadillo burrows for shelter. Only the adult pair breed, while the other members of the pack are subordinate, and help with rearing and guarding any pups. Packmates keep in contact with frequent whines, perhaps because visibility is poor in the undergrowth where they typically hunt. While eating large prey, parents position themselves at either ends of the animal, making it easier for the pups to disembowel it.

Reproduction

Bush dogs mate throughout the year; oestrus lasts up to twelve days and occurs every 15 to 44 days. Like many other canids, bush dog mating includes a copulatory tie, during which the animals are locked together. Urine-marking plays a significant role in their pre-copulatory behavior.

Gestation lasts from 65 to 83 days and normally results in the birth of a litter of three to six pups, although larger litters of up to 10 have been reported. The young are born blind and helpless and initially weigh . The eyes open after 14 to 19 days and the pups first emerge from the nativity den shortly thereafter. The young are weaned at around four weeks and reach sexual maturity at one year. They can live for up to 10 years in captivity.

References

Bibliography
 Nicole Duplaix and Noel Simon, World Guide to Mammals. Mandarin Publishers Ltd. (1976).
 Flower WH. 1880. On the bush-dog (Icticyon venaticus Lund). Proceedings of the Zoological Society of London 1880: 70–76.

External links

ARKive - images and movies of the bush dog (Speothos venaticus)
https://web.archive.org/web/20070401091117/http://www.canids.org/species/Speothos_venaticus.htm
Animal Diversity Web
ITIS database
Skeletal morphology data from UT Austin
Cachorro-do-mato-vinagre 

Speothos
Carnivorans of South America
Fauna of the Amazon
Fauna of the Guianas
Mammals of Bolivia
Mammals of Brazil
Mammals of Colombia
Mammals of Ecuador
Mammals of Guyana
Carnivorans of Central America
Mammals of Peru
Near threatened animals
Mammals of Venezuela
Near threatened biota of South America
bush dog